UGC 8335 (Arp 238) is a pair of strongly interacting spiral galaxies. They have been distorted by extreme tidal forces, creating prominent tidal tails and a bridge of gas and stars between the galaxies.

UGC 8335 is about 400 million light-years from Earth, in the constellation Ursa Major. It is the 238th object in Halton Arp's Atlas of Peculiar Galaxies.

Supernova 2012
On April 25, 2012, Supernova 2012 by was discovered in UGC 8335 by Doug Rich.  At the time of discovery, the supernova had a magnitude of 17.6. A peak magnitude measurement of 17.3 was recorded two days later, on April 27. SN 2012by was classified as a type II supernova by Tomasella et al. at the Astronomical Observatory of Padova. The research group also found that its spectrum was similar to that of SN 1996as.

References

External links 
 SIMBAD Astronomical Database
 NASA/IPAC Extragalactic Database
 Full Arp Atlas
 Arp Atlas image of Arp 238
 List of supernovae for 2012

Spiral galaxies
Interacting galaxies
Luminous infrared galaxies
046133
238
08335
Ursa Major (constellation)